Bradford Northern were a motorcycle speedway team based at Odsal Stadium, in Odsal, Bradford, from 1970 to 1973.

History
In June 1970, halfway through the Division Two season, promoters Les Whaley, Mike Parker and Bill Bridgett moved the Nelson Admirals side across the Pennines to Bradford to resurrect speedway at Odsal as Bradford Northern. The team spent three years in the British League Division Two. 

1974 saw the team name change to Bradford Barons.

Season summary

See also
 Odsal Boomerangs
 Bradford Panthers
 Bradford Tudors
 Bradford Barons
 Bradford Dukes

References

Sport in Bradford
Defunct British speedway teams